The Sri Lanka Light Infantry (SLLI) is the oldest regiment in the Sri Lanka Army and the oldest infantry regiment in the army. It is made up of ten regular battalions and five volunteer battalions, and is headquartered at the Panagoda Cantonment, Panagoda. Over the years it has become the most distinguished and dependable regiment in the army.

History
The regiment's origins can be traced back to the formation of the Ceylon Light Infantry Volunteers (CLIV) force which was formed on 1 April 1881 by a proclamation issued by the Governor of Ceylon as a reserve unit in Ceylon. The first commanding officer of the force was Lieutenant Colonel John Scott Armitage and the Colonel of the Regiment was Albert Edward, the Prince of Wales. The regiment's current Regimental March I am Ninety Five and the Regimental Bugle Call were adopted soon after this. In the same year, the Prince of Wales accepted the Honorary Colonelcy of the Ceylon Light Infantry Volunteers, and the unit adopted his crest and motto as its badge. In 1892, a mounted infantry company was formed and later it became a regiment of its own by the name of the Ceylon Mounted Rifles.

The Ceylon Light Infantry Volunteer force troops were sent to South Africa in 1900, where they took part in the Second Boer War. As a result of their service, the force was awarded a Banner from the Duke of York. In 1902, King Edward VII became the Colonel-in-Chief.

In 1910, after the formation of the Ceylon Defence Force, the CLIV became a part of it and was renamed the Ceylon Light Infantry. With the outbreak of World War II, CLI was mobilized and consisted of two battalions and was under the command of Lieutenant Colonel John Kotelawala. The CLI soon expanded and was deployed for home defense and overseas in the Seychelles and the Cocos Islands. The third battalion was raised in 1941, a fourth battalion in late 1942, and a fifth battalion in April 1943. One battalion each was deployed at Colombo, Kandy and Trincomalee, with the fourth battalion under training and one battalion reserved for special duties. Soon after the war a regular element of the regiment was formed to take up garrison duties in Ceylon. This unit was named the Mobilised Detachment of Ceylon Light Infantry (Mob. Det., CLI).

Ceylon gained its independence from Britain in 1948 and after the Army Act of 1949 was passed the CLI became the Ceylon Infantry Regiment and came under the newly formed Ceylon Army. In 1950, the regiment was reorganized, with two battalions being formed: the 1st Battalion, The Ceylon Light Infantry, became a regular unit and the Volunteer Battalion was re-designated as the 2nd (Volunteer) Battalion, Ceylon Light Infantry.

The regiment was deployed for counter insurgency operations during the 1971 Insurrection and in 1972, when  Sri Lanka became a republic, the regiment changed its name to Sri Lanka Light Infantry. Since the early 1980s units of the regiment have been deployed to the northern parts of the island. After being deployed, a patrol from the 1st Battalion's 'C' Company – designated Four Four Bravo – was ambushed, marking the beginning of the Sri Lanka civil war. Since then the SLLI has been deployed on combat operations throughout the island and has expanded a total of 15 battalions.

The regiment also took part in the United Nations Stabilization Mission in Haiti in 2003.

Regimental colours
The regimental colours were awarded in 1921 and on 22 March 1922 the Ceylon Light Infantry was awarded with the King's and the Regimental Colours. When the regular 1st Battalion was formed in 1949, HM Queen Elizabeth II presented the new colours to the battalion. The Queens and Regimental Colours were presented to the 1st Battalion on 21 April 1954. With the declaration of the Republic of Sri Lanka, the colours were laid to rest within the regimental museum on 29 June 1974. On 10 October 1978, H.E. President J.R. Jayawardena awarded President's and Regimental Colours to both the 1st and 2nd Battalions.

Regimental insignia
In the early stages of the regiment's history, from March 1881 to 28 November 1881, the volunteer corps used an elephant and a coconut tree as their emblem. With the declaration of the Republic of Sri Lanka the regiment's 1st and 2nd Battalions decided to retain as much of the configuration and pattern of the badge as possible, although a new insignia was introduced consisting of a silver bugle horn bound in brass to represent the regiment's role as a light infantry unit, and three paddy sheaves to signify prosperity. It also retained the motto of the Prince of Wales ICH DIEN, which was adopted as the motto of the regiment in its translated form I SERVE.

Units

Regular battalions
1st Sri Lanka Light Infantry (formed on 1950)
3rd Sri Lanka Light Infantry (formed on 16 December 1985 at Thissawewa camp Anuradhapura, later re-designated as the 1st Mechanized Infantry Regiment)
4th Sri Lanka Light Infantry (formed on 5 May 1987 at Monkey Bridge camp Trincomalee)
6th Sri Lanka Light Infantry (formed on 8 June 1990 at Panagoda Cantonment)
7th Sri Lanka Light Infantry (formed on 20 November 1992 at Mandative)
8th Sri Lanka Light Infantry (formed on 16 January 1993)
10th Sri Lanka Light Infantry (formed on 23 January 1994 at Mathagal and disbanded 1999. reformed 5 May 2001)
11th Sri Lanka Light Infantry (formed on 25 June 2007)
12th Sri Lanka Light Infantry (formed on 3 December 2007)
15th Sri Lanka Light Infantry
19th Sri Lanka Light Infantry
20th Sri Lanka Light Infantry
23rd Sri Lanka Light Infantry (formed on 23 July 2009)
24th Sri Lanka Light Infantry (formed on 25 September 2009)
25th Sri Lanka Light Infantry (formed on 20 September 2010)
26th Sri Lanka Light Infantry (formed on 20 September 2010)
RHQ Battalion Sri Lanka Light Infantry (RFT) (Formed on 23 October 1989 at Panagoda Cantonment)

Volunteer battalions
2nd (V) Sri Lanka Light Infantry (Formed on 1 April 1881)
5th (V) Sri Lanka Light Infantry (Formed on 15 August 1987 from disbanded 7 (V) SLAC)
9th (V) Sri Lanka Light Infantry (Formed on 1 November 1993 at Milady South)
14th (V) Sri Lanka Light Infantry (Formed on 31 December 1996 at Kayts)
16th (V) Sri Lanka Light Infantry (Formed on 1 December 2007)
17th (V) Sri Lanka Light Infantry (Formed on 30 March 2008)
18th (V) Sri Lanka Light Infantry (Formed on 1 January 2009 at Kelanimulla Camp and disbanded on 29 July 2018)
21st (V) Sri Lanka Light Infantry (Formed on 16 March 2009 and disbanded on 29 July 2018)
22nd (V) Sri Lanka Light Infantry (Formed on 14 January 2009 and disbanded on 30 March 2012)

Deployments
Second Boer War
World War I
Home defence
Western  front
World War II
Home defence
Seychelles
Cocos Islands
1971 Insurrection
Insurrection 1987-89
Sri Lankan Civil War
Eelam War I
Eelam War II
Eelam War III
Eelam War IV
United Nations Stabilization Mission in Haiti

Recipients of the Parama Weera Vibhushanaya
 Lance Corporal  W. I. M. Seneviratne 
 Lance Corporal  H. N. R. Semasinghe

Recipients of the Weera Wickrama Vibhushanaya
 Second lieutenant  K. M. U. B. Konarasinghe 6th Sri Lanka Light Infantry
 Sargent  U. M. Ekanayake 7th Sri Lanka Light Infantry 
 Lance Corporal  R. U. S. Dissanayeke 4th Sri Lanka Light Infantry 
 lieutenant  P. D. G. R. Nanayakkara 
 General  H. S. S. Kottegoda 
 Major General  R. A. Nugera
 Major General  H. M. J. K. Gunaratne
 Lance Corporal  H. M. Nawarathne 
 lieutenant  A. W. W. N. M. Silva 
 Major  M. M. M. Raj Fernando 
 Major  C. T. C. Serasinghe 
 Lance Corporal  G. J. Silva 3rd Sri Lanka Light Infantry

Honorary Colonels
 Prince Albert, the Prince of Wales (later King Edward VII)
 Prince Edward, the Prince of Wales (later King Edward VIII)
 Prince Henry, Duke of Gloucester (1937-1972)

Notable members
General Sir John Lionel Kotelawala, CH, KBE – Former Prime Minister of Ceylon
General D. S. Attygalle, MVO – Former Commander of the Sri Lankan Army
General T. I. Weerathunga, VSV, ndc – former Commander of the Sri Lankan Army and Chief of the Defence Staff
General Shantha Kottegoda, WWV, RWP, RSP, VSP, ndc -Former Commander of the Sri Lankan Army
Major General Anton Muttukumaru, OBE, ED – First Ceylonese Commander of the Ceylon Army
Major General B.R. Heyn – Former Commander of the Ceylon Army
Major General A.R. Udugama, MBE – Former Commander of the Ceylon Army
Justice Eugene Wilfred Jayewardene – Judge of the Supreme Court of Ceylon
Major E. A. Nugawela - first Cabinet Minister of Education of Ceylon, later Cabinet Minister of Health, a Member of Parliament and State Council.
Major Montague Jayawickrama - Government Ministers and Provincial Governor
Colonel T G Jayewardene – First Ceylonese commanding officer and former member of the State Council of Ceylon
Lieutenant Colonel Sir Hector van Cuylenburg, VD - first elected unofficial member representing the Burghers in the Legislative Council of Ceylon
Herbert Sri Nissanka, QC - Member of Parliament from Kurunegala
Brigadier Christopher Allan Hector Perera Jayawardena  - Conservator of Forests
Major General Lakshman 'Lucky' Wijayaratne RWP, RSP – Former brigade commander, 22 Brigade
Major General Nanda Mallawaarachchi, RWP, VSV, USP, ndc, psc – Former Chief of Staff of the Sri Lankan Army and present Sri Lankan Ambassador to Indonesia
Major General Amal Karunasekara, RSP, USP, ndu, psc, MSc - Chief of Staff of Sri Lanka Army
Major General Piyal Abeysekera USP, MSc - former Deputy Chief of Staff of Sri Lanka Army
Major General T.T. Ranjith de Silva, RWP, RSP, USP, PSC – Former Security Forces Commander – Eastern Province and Government Agent, Trincomalee District
Colonel Waldo Sansoni, OBE, VD, JP, UM – Colonel commanding, Ceylon Light Infantry (1935–1939)
Lieutenant Colonel Angelo Peiris, RWP, RSP – Leader of the first wave of the seaborne landing during Operation Balavegaya
Lieutenant Colonel Dhananjaya Weerabahu Wijesinghe, RSP – 2nd Commander – 7th Sri Lanka Light Infantry during the Third Eelam War
Major Bevis Bawa, ADC, CLI - former Aide-de-camp to the Governor of Ceylon
 Captain Ravi Jayewardene, CLI - former National Security Adviser

Order of precedence

References

External links and sources
 Sri Lanka Army
 Sri Lanka Light Infantry
 The museum of the Sri Lanka Light Infantry

Sri Lanka Light Infantry
Military units and formations established in 1881
1881 establishments in Ceylon
Military units and formations of Ceylon in World War II